Flying Aces was a monthly American periodical of short stories about aviation, one of a number of so-called "flying pulp" magazines popular during the 1920s and 1930s. Like other pulp magazines, it was a collection of adventure stories, originally printed on coarse, pulpy paper but later moved to a slick format. The magazine was launched in October 1928 by Periodical House, Inc. It featured stories written and illustrated by known authors of the day, often set against the background of World War I. Later issues added non-fiction aviation articles, as well as articles and plans for model airplanes. The latter became more prominent, and eventually the magazine was renamed Flying Models, and catered exclusively to aeromodeling hobbyists.

Historical context
The period from the late 1920s through the 1930s is considered the heyday of pulp fiction, and pulps were at the peak of their popularity.  Over 200 magazines were published monthly, reaching an audience of 10 million readers, with the most successful titles selling up to a million copies per issue.  Pulp fiction publishers employed unprecedented levels of market segmentation for their titles, exploring every popular category, including love stories, western stories, detective stories, and mystery stories. Publications were highly specialized, with each category having its own set of magazines, readers, and reader expectations.

This period also coincided with the golden days of aviation, highlighted by feats such as Lindbergh's solo flight across the Atlantic and the first extensive use of airplanes in combat in World War I.  Pulp publishers sought to capitalize on public interest in flying, which was influenced by stories of World War I flying aces, particularly Eddie Rickenbacker’s memoirs, Fighting the Flying Circus, and Elliot Spring's book on World War I combat flying, Nocturne Militaire.  The revived interest in these stories was also due to films such as the 1927 release of Wings and Howard Hughes' 1930 production of Hell's Angels, an epic, mega-budget movie featuring more than 100 pilots and dozens of planes, glorifying World War I American air aces.  The movie led to numerous similar films, and a plethora of aviation-oriented pulp magazines followed.  Nicknamed "flying pulps," more than forty pulps devoted to World War I air battles began publication during this time, including titles such as Aces (1928), Battle Birds (1932), Air Trails (1928), G-8 and his Battle Aces (1933), Sky Birds (1928), War Aces (1930), War Birds (1928), Wings (1927), and Flying Aces (1928).

Content
The magazine’s genre was air adventure stories, some set against a war background, written by well-known authors such as Lester Dent, Donald E. Keyhoe, Joe Archibald, and Arch Whitehouse.  With the exception of Keyhoe and Whitehouse, who was with the RAF in World War I, the authors had no personal knowledge of flying.  The plot invariably centered on a hero — a military pilot — trapped in a difficult situation, from which he would extricate himself utilizing exceptional flying skills.  The stories never featured any love interest or profanity.  Attempts to introduce such elements were soundly rejected by the readership.  According to Whitehouse, he tried hard to introduce a "seductive secretary" character to the Kerry Keene series, but the effort was met with numerous letters from readers demanding that he "Get rid of the broad. Get her out of the series of Kerry Keene stories."

The cover art featured dramatic air battle scenes painted by notable commercial artists of the day, such as Alex Schomburg and his brother August Schomburg.

Notable series and recurring characters 
Many of the stories published were part of long-running series, featuring well developed characters who appeared in every story.

Kerry Keene/The Griffon
Created by Arch Whitehouse, Kerry Keene, the Griffon, was a Department of Justice employee, and the pilot of an amphibian plane. The plane incorporated many modern design elements, such as folding wings and retractable landing gear (wheels and floats).  This enabled the plane to land on water in Long Island Sound and then run up into a secret hangar on land, not far from  Keene's residence in New York City. Keene was accompanied by his side-kick, an Irish mechanic named Barney O’Dare.  Several features of the plane were incorporated into airplane models sold by the magazine’s advertisers. 43 stories were published between 1935 and 1942. Altus Press is doing a reprint series, with Pro Se Press doing new stories.

Phineas Pinkham

Joe Archibald created the character of Lt. Phineas Pinkham, a World War I pilot stationed in Bar-le-Duc, France, as part of the "9th pursuit squadron."  Phineas, a freckled farm boy from Boontown, Iowa, was a fearless stunt performer, to the disapproval of the squadron commander, Major Rufus Garrity and the flight leader, Captain Howell.  His creator describes him as "maybe the worst pilot to fly a plane…downed more Krauts with trickery than any other way."  Like American World War I ace Eddie Rickenbacker, he flew a Spad biplane, and was the first pilot to rig the plane with a rear-gun — a shotgun operated with wires from the cockpit.  The series ran in Flying Aces for 12 years.  Archibald later published the collection of stories as The Phineas Pinkham Scrapbook.

Captain Philip Strange

Created by Donald Keyhoe, Captain Strange, was referred to as "the Brain Devil" and "the Phantom Ace of G.2.". Captain Strange was an American intelligence officer during World War I who was gifted with ESP and other mental powers.  His stories ran for nine years, 1931–39, with 64 stories. Age of Aces has reprinted the whole series.

Richard Knight

Created by Donald Keyhoe, his other "superpowered" flying ace was Richard Knight, a World War I veteran who was blinded in combat but gained a supernatural ability to see in the dark. Knight featured in a number of adventure stories set in the 1930s (when the stories were written).  His series lasted for seven years, from 1936–42, for 35 stories. Altus Press is doing a reprint series, with Pro Se Press doing new stories.

Publication history
The magazine was launched in October 1928 by Periodical House, Inc. It was initially published in a 7x10” format, with more than 100 pages per issue, and sold for 15 cents per copy.  In November 1933, the magazine moved to the so-called "slick" format — an 8½x10" format printed on glossy paper and began featuring full-sized plans for model airplanes in every issue. Issue size was reduced to 74 pages. The magazine was published on a monthly basis. In addition to adventure stories, non-fiction aviation articles and aviation news were added, as were modeling articles.  The magazine’s tagline became "Fiction, Model Building, Fact — Three Aviation Magazines in One."

During World War II the magazine had been subtitled "Magazine of the Flying Age". The content focused on the war effort, with little advertising, and late in the war the name changed briefly to Flying Age.  In later years, aviation modeling articles started appearing more regularly and became more and more dominant, until finally, in 1947, the magazine was renamed Flying Models, and later sold to Carstens Publications in 1969, without the fiction content. Flying Models ceased publication in 2014.

Impact and historical significance 
Many American pilots who took part in World War II grew up during the 1930s enthusiastically reading flying pulps such as Flying Aces, and were captivated by the adventure stories, an experience that no doubt played a part in their decision to become military aviators themselves. Joseph W. Rutter, a pilot in the Army Air Force in 1944, recalls this vividly in his book Wreaking Havoc: A Year in an A-20, as does First Blue, the biography of Roy Marlin Voris, World War II ace and two-time commander of the Blue Angels.

Many have noted the uncannily accurate way that stories in Flying Aces predicted the Japanese attack on Pearl Harbor as well as the locations of other air battles of the Pacific Theater.

Fan club
In addition to the magazine, the publishers created a fan club for readers.  Members were organized into regional "squadrons," and were offered flying-themed stationery, stickers, and even uniforms mimicking those in use by the United States Army Air Forces.  The club arranged meetings between readers and notable military and commercial pilots, both American and foreign. Some of the "squadrons" originated by the magazine have lived on, as clubs for modeling enthusiasts. The Flying Aces Club, a model airplane club dedicated to free-flight models, takes its name from the magazine and its old clubs. A Flying Aces Club squadron in Connecticut has named its airstrip 'Pinkham Field' in honor of the fictional Phineas Pinkham.

References

Bibliography
Aviation's Great Recruiter, Herm L. Schreiner, Kent State University Press, 2005
Harlan Ellison: The Edge of Forever, Ellen Weil, Gary K. Wolfe, Ohio State University Press, 2001
Science-Fiction: The Gernsback Years : A Complete Coverage of the Genre Magazines ... From 1926 Through 1936, Everett Franklin Bleiler, Richard Bleiler, Kent State University Press, 1998
Sports in the Pulp Magazines, John A. Dinan, McFarland, 1998
The Pulp Hero - Deluxe Edition, Nick Carr, Ver Curtiss and Ron Hanna, Wild Cat Books, Lulu.com, 2008
Lance Star - Sky Ranger, Larry Marshall, Wild Cat Books, Lulu.com, 2006
Yesterday's Faces: Glory figures, Robert Sampson, Popular Press, 1983
American Aviation Historical Society journal, v14-15, 1969, American Aviation Historical Society
Wreaking Havoc: A Year in an A-20, Joseph W. Rutter, Texas A&M University Press, 2003
Reflections of Pearl Harbor, K. D. Richardson, Praeger Publishers, 2005

External links
 Flying Aces at Internet Archive

Fiction about aerial warfare
Aviation magazines
Defunct magazines published in the United States
Magazines established in 1928
Magazines disestablished in 1945
Pulp magazines
Pulp series pop
Monthly magazines published in the United States